Leonid Eremeyevich Zakharov (born 14 January 1947) is a Russian physicist who is a researcher at Princeton University. He attended Lomonosov Moscow State University (1965–1971). He was awarded the status of Fellow in the American Physical Society, after they were nominated by their Division of Plasma Physics  in 2007, for "contributions to the theory and numerical calculation of magnetohydrodynamic equilibria, stability, and transport in toroidal plasma confinement devices and for innovative ideas concerning the development of a lithium walled tokamak as an approach to an economic reactor."

References 

Living people
1947 births
Fellows of the American Physical Society
American Physical Society
Russian physicists
Moscow State University alumni